Miriam Lucile Bomhard (1898 – 1952) was a conservationist and botanist from the United States of America. She was the first woman to receive a PhD from the University of Pittsburgh.

Early life
Bomhard was born in Bellevue, Kentucky, the daughter of the Reverend W.A. Bomhard and Emma Koch Bomhard. The family moved to Pittsburgh in 1907. in 1917, She graduated as valedictorian of her high school.

Studies and career
Bomhard attended the University of Pittsburgh on an honour scholarship. She graduated in 1921. She began work at the University of Pittsburgh as a graduate assistant and then as an instructor in the botany department. She conducted research work alongside this, including work at the Carnegie Museum Herbarium. She received a PhD in 1926, the first women to receive that degree from University of Pittsburgh. Her doctoral thesis was on the subject of illustrations and keys in the identification of seeds in Allegheny County, Pennsylvania.

In 1926, she began work at Newcomb College, which was then the women's department of Tulane University in New Orleans, teaching zoology and botany. She worked there until 1932. She then embarked on a trip to the British colony Malaya. In 1933, on her return to the United States, she began work as a junior pathologist, and then as a botanist at the Bureau of Plant Industry in Washington, D.C., later named the United States Forest Service, where she worked until her death.

Membership of societies
She was a member of many organisations, including:

 American Association for the Advancement of Science
 American Society of Plant Taxonomists
 Botanical Society of Washington
 Ecological Society of America
 International Association for Plant Taxonomy
 New Orleans Society of Plant Sciences
 Society of American Foresters
 Washington Academy of Sciences

Publications
 The Wax Palms (1930)
 Range Plant Handbook (1937)
 Standardized Plant Names (1942). Contributor,
 Palm trees in the United States (1950). Contributor.
 Sourcebook of forage plants on longleaf pine - bluestem ranges of Louisiana (1952). Co-author.

Death
Bomhard died in Glenshaw, Pennsylvania.

References 

1898 births
1952 deaths
University of Pittsburgh alumni
People from Bellevue, Kentucky
Conservationists
American women botanists
20th-century American botanists
20th-century American women scientists
Scientists from Pittsburgh
Kentucky women botanists
Tulane University faculty
United States Forest Service officials
American women academics
Women in forestry